The Loxton railway line is a closed railway line in the northern Murray Mallee region of South Australia. It ran north-east from Tailem Bend to grain silos near Loxton.

History
The first stage of the Brown's Well railway line  opened from Tailem Bend to Wanbi on 6 January 1913, and extended to Paruna by the end of April the same year.  A branch from Alawoona to Loxton opened on 13 February 1914. The main line to Alawoona and only remaining branch to Loxton closed on 6 January 1996 to be gauge converted from broad gauge to standard gauge to retain connection to the main line from Adelaide to Melbourne after that line was converted. The last grain train left the silos on 20 June 2015, marking the closure of the line.

Route
The railway branched off the main line just south of Tailem Bend, and tracked roughly north-east. The Karoonda Highway from Murray Bridge East paralleled it after about 24 kilometres at Kulde. The railway and highway continued together 100 kilometres north-east through Karoonda to Alawoona, then both turned north for the final 35 kilometres to Loxton.

The line no longer continues to Loxton station, having been curtailed at a bulk grain facility a few kilometres short of the town. The end of the main line became the grain terminal at what was originally the Tookayerta siding. The line closed on 20 July 2015, with all grain traffic now taken by road.

References

Closed railway lines in South Australia
Railway lines closed in 2015
Standard gauge railways in Australia